The Asia Islands are a group of three small islands in the open sea north of the Raja Ampat Archipelago of eastern Indonesia. The individual islands are known as Fani, Igi and Miarin. On the largest island of Fani, there is a pier and a small settlement, intermittently inhabited by visitors from Reni and Rutum. Administratively the Asia Islands are part of the Raja Ampat Regency of the province of Southwest Papua.

References

Islands of Indonesia

Raja Ampat Islands
Archipelagoes of Indonesia